The Khatyspyt Formation is a Neoproterozoic formation exposed in the Olenëk Uplift of north central Siberia,
which contains the only known instance of the Ediacara biota preserved in a limestone bed. The Khatyspyt Formation forms one of the major parts of the Khorbusuonka Group; underlying the Khatyspyt are dolomites of the Mastakh Formation and their overlying red beds; the Turkut Formation overlies the Khatyspyt. The Khatyspyt and part of the overlying Turkut comprise a major shallowing upward marine carbonate sequence.   Khatyspytia is named after this formation.

References

Geologic formations of Russia
Geology of Siberia
Ediacaran Asia